Trần Đề is a rural district (huyện) of Sóc Trăng province in the Mekong River Delta region of Vietnam. As of 2009 the district had a population of 130,077. The district covers an area of 378.76 km². The district capital lies at Trần Đề.

Trần Đề district was established in 2009.

Commune-level subdivisions
Lịch Hội Thượng township
Trần Đề township
Lịch Hội Thượng commune
Trung Bình
Đại Ân 2
Liêu Tú
Thạnh Thới An
Thạnh Thới Thuận
Tài Văn
Viên An
Viên Bình

References

Districts of Sóc Trăng province